Cuadrado is Spanish for "square". It may refer to:

Juan Cuadrado, Colombian footballer 
Ibán Cuadrado, Spanish footballer 
Carlos Cuadrado, Spanish professional tennis player
Verónica Cuadrado, Spanish handball player
Radha Cuadrado, Filipino singer and songwriter
José Fernando Cuadrado, Colombian football goalkeeper
Oliver Cuadrado, Spanish football goalkeeper

See also
 Quadrado (disambiguation)